Montt may refer to:

Given name 

Montt Mardié (born 1983), Swedish singer, songwriter, multi-instrumentalist and composer

Surname 

Alberto Montt, modern Chilean comic designer
Ambrosio Montt Luco (1830–1899), Chilean politician and lawyer
Andrés Wood Montt (born 1965), Chilean film director, producer and writer
Cristina Montt (1895–1969), Chilean film star of silent and early sound films
Efraín Ríos Montt (1926–2018), former de facto President of Guatemala, dictator, army general
Jorge Montt (1845–1922), vice admiral of the Chilean Navy, president of Chile from 1891 to 1896
José Anacleto Montt Goyenechea (1802–1867), Chilean politician and lawyer
Manuel Montt (1809–1880), Chilean statesman and scholar
Montt family of Chile became politically influential during the 19th century; it is still important
Pedro Montt (1849–1910), Chilean political figure
Rosario Montt (1820s – 1894), First Lady of Chile from 1851 to 1861
Teresa Wilms Montt (1893–1921), Chilean writer, poet and anarcho-feminist
Zury Ríos Montt (born 1968), Guatemalan politician with the Guatemalan Republican Front (FRG) political party

Places 
Jorge Montt Glacier, tidewater glacier in the Aisén Region of Chile
Jorge Montt Island, in the Patagonian Archipelago in Magallanes y la Antártica Chilena Region, Chile
Manuel Montt metro station, on the Line 1 of the Santiago Metro, in Santiago, Chile
Puerto Montt, port city and commune in southern Chile

See also
Mont (disambiguation)
Mott (disambiguation)